4-Ethyltoluene is an organic compound with the formula CH3C6H4C2H5.  It is one of three isomers of ethyltoluene, the other two isomers being 3-ethyltoluene and 2-ethyltoluene. All are colorless liquids and all are used for the production of specialty polystyrenes.

Production and use
Ethyltoluene is produced by ethylation of toluene:
CH3C6H5  +  C2H4   →   CH3C6H4C2H5
Over typical acid catalysts, this process gives a mixture of the 2-, 3-, and 4- isomers.  Using a modified zeolite catalyst, the alkylation is shape-selective for the 4- isomer.   

4-Ethyltoluene is subjected dehydrogenation to give 4-vinyltoluene.

References

Alkylbenzenes
C3-Benzenes